Larry Cowling is an American politician. He was a member of the Arkansas House of Representatives from the 2nd district, serving from 2007 to 2013. He is a member of the Democratic party.

References

Living people
Democratic Party members of the Arkansas House of Representatives
21st-century American politicians
Year of birth missing (living people)